Youjia Town is a town of Xinhua County in Hunan, China. The town is located in the central part of the county, it is bordered by Menggong Town and Youxi Township to the north, by Caojia Town to the east, by the subdistrict of Shangmei and Luguan Town to the south, by Xihe Town to the west. The town has 35 villages and a community under its jurisdiction in 2017.

Administrative division
In 2017, Youjia Town transferred Huayuan Village to Shangmei Subdistrict, three villages to Shangdu Subdistrict, the town has 35 villages and a community under its jurisdiction.

35 villages
 Baota Village
 Changtian Village
 Chuntian Village
 Daotian Village
 Dongling Village
 Heping Xingcun Village
 Honghuayuan Village
 Hongxing Village
 Hongxingyuan Village
 Huanghailong Village
 Huangjialing Village
 Huiguang Village
 Jianfeng Village
 Jiaxin Village
 Jinsheng Village
 Limin Village
 Lishan Xincun Village
 Lixing Village
 Longtan Village
 Longxing Village
 Luguang Village
 Runmin Village
 Shibanshan Village
 Tianjia Village
 Tongfeng Village
 Tongli Village
 Xiejiamiao Village
 Xieliangshan Village
 Xinjingchong Village
 Xiyuan Village
 Yong'an Village
 Youjia Village
 Zhenxing Village
 Zhongxing Village
 Zhujia Village

a community
 Youjiawan Community

the following four villages were moved to Shangmei Town,

 Huayuan Village, moved to Shangmei Subdistrict
 Jinzishan Village, moved to Shangdu Subdistrict
 Tishang Village, moved to Shangdu Subdistrict
 Xingling Village, moved to Shangdu Subdistrict

References

External links

Divisions of Xinhua County